Chrysomelini is a tribe of leaf beetles in the family Chrysomelidae. There are over 150 described genera in Chrysomelini, variously arranged into subtribes, though the exact number and constituency of these subtribes is a source of ongoing debate.

Selected genera
 Cadiz Andrews & Gilbert, 1992
 Calligrapha Chevrolat, 1836
 Chrysolina Motschulsky, 1860
 Chrysomela Linnaeus, 1758
 Doryphora Illiger, 1807
 Entomoscelis Chevrolat, 1836
 Gastrophysa Chevrolat, 1836
 Gonioctena Chevrolat, 1836
 Labidomera Chevrolat, 1836
 Leptinotarsa Chevrolat, 1836
 Microtheca Stål, 1860
 Paropsisterna Motschulsky, 1860
 Phaedon Latreille, 1829
 Phratora Chevrolat, 1836
 Plagiodera Chevrolat, 1836
 Prasocuris Latreille, 1802
 Proseicela Chevrolat, 1836
 Trachymela Weise, 1908
 Zygogramma Chevrolat, 1836

References

Further reading

 Arnett, R. H. Jr., M. C. Thomas, P. E. Skelley and J. H. Frank. (eds.). (21 June 2002). American Beetles, Volume II: Polyphaga: Scarabaeoidea through Curculionoidea. CRC Press LLC, Boca Raton, Florida .
 Arnett, Ross H. (2000). American Insects: A Handbook of the Insects of America North of Mexico. CRC Press.
 Richard E. White. (1983). Peterson Field Guides: Beetles. Houghton Mifflin Company.

External links

 NCBI Taxonomy Browser, Chrysomelini

Chrysomelinae
Taxa named by Pierre André Latreille
Beetle tribes